Fair Game is a 1988 Italian thriller-horror film written and directed by Mario Orfini.

Plot 
After being dumped by his girlfriend Eva, who was tired of his unrelentingly negative and sexist attitude, Gene decides to take revenge by killing her with a mamba, a venomous snake, into which he also injected hormones to increase its aggressiveness.

Cast 
Trudie Styler as Eva
Gregg Henry as Gene
Bill Moseley as Frank

Production 
The film had a budget of 4.6 million dollars. Set design was made by Ferdinando Scarfiotti, while costumes were designed by Milena Canonero. It was shot between Los Angeles, Cinecittà and the Mojave Desert. To reproduce the movements of the mamba, Orfini used a steadicam technique.

Reception  
The film bombed at the Italian box office, grossing only 539,521,000 lire. It was distributed in 36 foreign countries.

References

External links 

English-language Italian films
1980s horror thriller films
1988 horror films
1988 films
Italian horror thriller films
Films scored by Giorgio Moroder
Films about snakes
1980s English-language films
1980s Italian films